Guyana national field hockey team may refer to:
 Guyana men's national field hockey team
 Guyana women's national field hockey team